The Guandi Temple on Communist Youth League Street is a historical temple dedicated to Guan Yu in the Tianqiao district of Jinan, Shandong Province, China. It is one of the three best-preserved Guanyu temples in the area of Jinan, the other two are Guandi Temple in the Water Lily Street and in Xianxi Alley.

Layout
The Ximizhi Spring, the 35th spring in the list of Jinan's "seventy-two famous springs" and a member of the Five Dragon Pool spring group is located in the courtyard of the temple. The building complex consists of two structures, the Mizhi Hall in the north and the Guandi Temple proper in the south.

History
According to the tradition, the grand eunuch An Dehai, a confidant of the Empress Dowager Cixi, was beheaded near the Ximizhi Spring  on 12 September 1869 on orders of the governor Ding Baozhen, who followed an edict of the Empress Dowager Ci'an. The execution for falsely claiming to be on an imperial mission was likely part of a power struggle between the Empress Dowager Cixi and Prince Gong.

Location
The temple is located on Communist Youth League Street, to the west of the Five Dragon Pool.

See also
List of sites in Jinan

References

Guandi temples
Buildings and structures in Shandong
Tourist attractions in Jinan